The Diocese of Saint-Dié (is a Latin Church ecclesiastical territory or diocese of the Catholic Church in France. The diocese has the same boundaries as the département of the Vosges. The bishop's cathedra is Saint-Dié Cathedral in the town now named Saint-Dié-des-Vosges, but since 1944 has lived in Épinal, capital of the département. The Diocese of Saint–Dié is a suffragan diocese in the ecclesiastical province of the metropolitan Archdiocese of Besançon. The current bishop is Jean-Paul Marie Mathieu, who was appointed in December 2005.

History

The Diocese of Saint-Dié originated in the celebrated abbey of that name. Saint Deodatus (Dié) (b. towards the close of the sixth century; died 679) came, according his legendary written in 1050 by benedictin monks of Moyenmoutier, from Nevers and the Nivernais.

According to some historians, we do not known where Deodatus comes from : a hypothesis proposed from Ireland which explained the Latin reading confusion between Niverniensis and hiberniensis, others searchers think he could be a Christian who has travelled a lot, and may be lived in the North of Britain's Islands. He may be educated too in Austrasia by Scottish monks attracted by the reputation of Saint Columbanus.

Some sceptical scientists add this legend would definitely distinguish Déodat as a holy itinerant who was not a benedictin monk : he comes from nowhere. Maybe he was just a Christian chief. Only one fact is sure : Déodat is the founder and first patron of a Merovingian district with political and religious power, a ban decided by the king of Austrasia Childeric II. And, after his dead, he was considered and consacred by local populations as a holy man. As, for orthodoxic thinkers of these times, only monk could be perfect, Déodat was becoming gradually a monk.

Legendary versions show this holy man, in old French Bonhomme on little mountainous paths between Rambervillers and Colmar. They tell us he made the acquaintance of Saints Arbogast and Florentius and walked with through the passes. From Alsace, sometimes from the Heilige Wald, German term for Hollywood, near Haguenau, he withdrew to the Vosges, sojourning at Romont where he began a lot of miracles, and Arentelle, where the inhabitants were hostile. For some time he was a solitary at Wilra or Wibra, maybee near the present Katzenthal in Alsace, but being persecuted by the inhabitants, he walked with a big stick who planted in soil created always a spring of water. Above the pass of Bonhomme, on the top of Rossberg, he launched an ironed arm until a locus called Petit-Saint-Dié under the Kemberg, a mountain, precisely under rocks Saint-Martin. Springs of flowed on this left side of the Meurthe, and he founded a refuge under rocks and near above springs. Once he received this lands in 669 he decided to work. His first monastery hardly built with new brothership, he was tied and dreamed to build a monastery in a little hill "Juncturae" in the right side of the river, the future Galilée. Longtime a prairie, then a little town, and now the center of Saint-Dié-des-Vosges stand between this two places.

Before this time, Leudin Bodo, Bishop of Toul, had founded to the north-west of Saint-Dié the monastery of Bonmoutier for his daughter and to the south of Bonmoutier that of Etival; Saint Gondelbert, perhaps after resigning the Archbishopric of Sens, had just founded Senones Abbey to the east. These four monasteries formed, by their geographical position the four extremities of a cross. Later, Saint Hidulphus, Bishop of Trier (d 707), erected between them at the intersection of the two arms of the cross, the monastery of Moyenmoutier. Villigod and Martin (disciples of Saint Dié), Abbot Spinulus (Spin), John the priest, and the deacon Benignus (disciples of Saint Hidulphus) are honoured as saints.

In the 10th century the Abbey of Saint-Dié grew lax, and Frederick I, Duke of Lorraine, expelled the Benedictines, replacing them by the Canons Regular of St. Augustine. Pope Gregory V, in 996, agreed to the change and decided that the grand prévôt, the principal dignitary of the abbey, should depend directly upon the Holy See.

During the sixteenth century, profiting by the long vacancy of the see of Toul, the abbots of the several monasteries in the Vosges, without actually declaring themselves independent of the diocese of Toul, claimed to exercise a quasi-episcopal jurisdiction as to the origin of which, however, they were not agreed; in the eighteenth century they pretended to be nullius dioceseos. In 1718, Thiard de Bissy, Bishop of Toul, requested the election of a see at Saint-Dié. Leopold, Duke of Lorraine, was in favour of this step, but the King of France opposed it; the Holy See refrained for the time from action.

This diocese was erected in 1777 after the French annexation of the duchy of Lorraine. The territory consists of numerous monastic Vosgian territories and other lands, belonging to the venerable Diocese of Toul: the new Diocese of Saint-Dié was until the end of the Ancien Régime, was a suffragan of Trier.

The diocese was transformed by the Civil Constitution of the Clergy in 1790 and officially called of Vosges and especially of Epinal: it had indeed been established in the new departamental area. Nevertheless, it was sometimes referred to at that period as the diocese of Saint-Dié, because the bishop Monsieur de Chaumont decided to stay and keep his episcopal seat. During the Revolutionary period it was suppressed, after an overnight flight by the bishop.

The Holy See and the French Republic, represented by Napoléon Bonaparte, validated this state of fact as many others in the peaceful Concordat of 1801. It was decided to give this territory to the diocese of Nancy. The King Louis XVIII and Roman Catholic ecclesiastics later restored it in name by the Concordat of 1817, but local Christians waited much later, after a Papal bull of 6 October 1822, and a royal ordinance of 13 January 1823, as a suffragan of Besançon. According to a principle sanctioned by this last Concordat, the diocesan boundaries were realigned, however, to follow those of the civil department of the Vosges.

The Franco-German War closed by the Treaty of Frankfurt (1871) removed eighteen communes in the valley of the River Bruche from the department of the Vosges and the diocese of Saint-Dié, adding them respectively to Nieder-Elsass (Bas-Rhin) and the Diocese of Strasbourg.
Louis Caverot, who died as Cardinal Archbishop of Lyon, was Bishop of Saint-Dié from 1849 to 1876.

Other religious houses in the diocese

Saints and religious of the diocese

Besides the saints mentioned above and some others, bishops of Nancy and Toul, the, following are honoured in a special manner in the Diocese of Saint-Dié:
 Saint Sigebert, Merovingian King of Austrasia (630–56)
 Saint Germain, a hermit near Remiremont, a martyr, who died Abbot of Grandval, near Basle (618–70)
 Saint Hunna, a penitent at Saint-Dié (d. about 672)
 Saint Dagobert, another King of Austrasia, slain by his servant Grimoald in 679 and honoured as a martyr
 Saint Modesta, a nun at Remiremont, afterwards foundress and abbess of the monastery of Horren at Trier (seventh century)
 Saint Simeon, Bishop of Metz (eighth century), whose relics are preserved at Senones
 Saint Goéry, Bishop of Metz (d. about 642), whose relics are preserved at Epinal and who is the patron of the butchers of the town
 Saint William and Saint Achery, hermits near Ste. Marie aux Mines
 Richardis (wife of Charles the Fat), who died as Abbess of Andlau in Alsace
 Blessed Joan of Arc, b. at Domrémy in the diocese
 Saint Pierre Fourier (b. at Méricourt, 1565; d. 1640), curé of Mattaincourt, who founded the Order of Notre-Dame
 Venerable Mére Alix le Clerc (b. at Remiremont, 1576; d. 1622)

Elizabeth de Ranfaing (born at Remiremont, 1592; died 1649) founded in the Diocese of Toul the congregation of Our Lady of Refuge; Catherine de Bar (b. at Saint-Dié, 1614; d. 1698), known as Mére Mechtilde of the Blessed Sacrament, at first an Annunciade nun and then a Benedictine, founded at Paris, in 1654, the Order of the Benedictines of the Perpetual Adoration of the Blessed Sacrament. Elizabeth Brem (1609–68, known as Mother Benedict of the Passion), a Benedictine nun at Rambervillers, established in that monastery the Institute of the Perpetual Adoration. The remains of Brother Joseph Formet (1724–84, known as the hermit of Ventron), are the object of a pilgrimage. Venerable Jean Martin Moye (1730–93), founder in Lorraine of the Congrégation de la Providence for the instruction of young girls and apostle of Su-Tchuen, was director for a brief period of the seminary of Saint-Dié, and established at Essegney, in the diocese, one of the first novitiates of the Soeurs de la Providence (hospitallers and teachers), whose mother-house at Portieux ruled over a large number of houses before the Law of 1901. Grandclaude, a village teacher who was sent to the Roman College in 1857 by Bishop Caverot, contributed, when a professor in the grand seminaire of Saint-Dié, to the revival of canon law studies in France.

Bishops

Jacques-Alexis Jacquemin † (13 Aug 1823 Appointed – Jan 1830 Retired)
Jacques-Marie-Antoine-Célestin du Pont † (9 May 1830 Appointed – 1 May 1835 Appointed, Archbishop of Avignon)
Jean-Joseph-Marie-Eugène de Jerphanion † (1 May 1835 Appointed – 15 Jul 1842 Appointed, Archbishop of Albi)
Jean-Nicaise Gros † (15 Jul 1842 Appointed – 3 Mar 1844 Appointed, Bishop of Versailles)
Daniel-Victor Manglard † (21 Apr 1844 Appointed – 17 Feb 1849 Died)
Louis-Marie-Joseph-Eusèbe Caverot † (16 Mar 1849 Appointed – 20 Apr 1876 Appointed, Archbishop of Lyon)
Albert-Marie-Camille de Briey † (20 Apr 1876 Appointed – 10 Nov 1888 Died)
Etienne-Marie-Alphonse Sonnois † (21 Dec 1889 Appointed – 26 Nov 1892 Appointed, Archbishop of Cambrai)
Alphonse-Gabriel-Pierre Foucault † (3 Jan 1893 Appointed – 28 May 1930 Died)
Louis-Augustin Marmottin † (2 Aug 1930 Appointed – 21 Aug 1940 Appointed, Archbishop of Reims)
Emile-Arsène Blanchet † (6 Oct 1940 Appointed – 10 Oct 1946 Resigned)
Henri-René-Adrien Brault † (29 Sep 1947 Appointed – 11 Jul 1964 Died)
Jean-Félix-Albert-Marie Vilnet (24 Sep 1964 Appointed – 13 Aug 1983 Appointed, Bishop of Lille)
Paul-Marie Joseph André Guillaume (29 Oct 1984 Appointed – 14 Dec 2005 Retired)
Jean-Paul Mary Mathieu (14 Dec 2005 Appointed – 15 June 2016 Retired)
Didier Berthet (15 June 2016 Appointed)

Pilgrimages of the diocese

The principal pilgrimages of the diocese are: Notre-Dame de Saint-Dié, at Saint-Dié, at the place where Saint Dié erected his first sanctuary; Notre-Dame du Trésor, at Remiremont; Notre-Dame de Consolation, at Epinal; Notre-Dame de la Brosse, at Bains; Notre-Dame de Bermont, near Domrémy, the sanctuary at which Joan of Arc prayed; and the tomb of Saint Peter Fourier at Mattaincourt.

Religious institutions in the diocese up to 1905

There were in the diocese before the application of the Law of 1901 against the congregations: Augustianian Canons of Lateran; Clerks Regular of Our Saviour; Eudistes; Franciscans, Fathers of the Holy Ghost and the Holy Heart of Mary and various teaching orders of brothers. Among the congregations of nuns founded in the diocese may be mentioned besides the Soeurs de la Providence, the Soeurs du Pauvre Enfant Jésus (also known as the Soeurs de la bienfaisance chrétienne), teachers and hospitallers, founded in 1854 at Chemoy l'Orgueilleux; the mother-house was transferred to Remiremont.

At the close of the nineteenth century the religious congregations in the diocese directed 7 créchés, 55-day nurseries, 1 orphanage for boys and girls; 19 girls' orphanages, 13 workshops, 1 house of refuge; 4 houses for the assistance of the poor, 36 hospitals or hospices, 11 houses of nuns devoted to the care of the sick in their own homes and 1 insane asylum. The diocese of Saint-Dié had in 1905 (at the time of the rupture of the Concordat), 421,104 inhabitants in 32 parishes, 354 succursal parishes and 49 vicariates supported by the State.

References

Sources
 Catholic Encyclopedia: Saint-Dié

Acknowledgment

Roman Catholic dioceses in France